Trachylepis boettgeri, commonly known as Boettger's mabuya, is a species of skink, a lizard in the family Scincidae. The species is endemic to Madagascar.

Etymology
Both the specific name, boettgeri, and the common name, Boettger's mabuya, are in honor of German herpetologist Oskar Boettger.

Habitat

Behavior
T. boettgeri is terrestrial and diurnal.

References

Further reading
Angel F (1942). "Les Lézards de Madagascar ". Mem. Acad. Malagache, Tananarive 36: 1–193. (Mabuya boettgeri, p. 109). (in French).
Bauer AM (2003). "On the identity of Lacerta punctata Linnaeus, 1758, the type species of the genus Euprepis Wagler, 1830, and the generic assignment of Afro-Malagasy skinks". African Journal of Herpetology 52 (1): 1–7. (Trachylepis boettgeri, new combination).
Boulenger GA (1887). Catalogue of the Lizards in the British Museum (Natural History). Second Edition. Volume III. ... Scincidæ ... London: Trustees of the British Museum (Natural History). (Taylor and Francis, printers). xii + 575 pp. + Plates I-XL. (Mabuia boettgeri, new species, p. 173 + Plate X, figures 3, 3a).
Glaw F, Vences M (1994). A Fieldguide to the Amphibians and Reptiles of Madagascar, Second Edition. Cologne, Germany: Vences & Glaw Verlag / Serpents Tale. 480 pp. . (Mabuya boettgeri, p. 312).
Glaw F, Vences M (2006). A Field Guide to the Amphibians and Reptiles of Madagascar, Third Edition. Cologne: Vences & Glaw Verlag. 496 pp. .

Trachylepis
Reptiles of Madagascar
Reptiles described in 1887
Taxa named by George Albert Boulenger